Antonino "Nino" Barillà (born 1 April 1988) is an Italian professional footballer who plays as a central midfielder for  club Viterbese.

Club career
Barillà made his debut in Serie A with Reggina in the 2005–06 season, on 7 May 2006 against Fiorentina.

Barillà scored his first goal against then Serie A club Torino in a Serie A match, the game ended (2–2). His second goal came against Juventus on 26 April 2009 where he scored with his head at the near post from an Adejo cross which was delivered from just outside the penalty area on the top right side.

On 25 August 2020, Barillà joined newly-promoted Serie B club Monza on a two-year contract. He was released by the club on 25 January 2022.

On 25 February 2022, Barillà signed with Serie B club Alessandria until the end of the season.

On 13 January 2023, Barillà signed with Serie C club Viterbese.

International career
On 25 March 2009, Barillà made his debut with the Italy under-21 team in a friendly match against Austria. He played seven games for the under-21 side, scoring two goals.

References

External links
 

Living people
1988 births
Sportspeople from Reggio Calabria
Footballers from Calabria
Italian footballers
Italy under-21 international footballers
Association football midfielders
Reggina 1914 players
Ravenna F.C. players
U.C. Sampdoria players
Trapani Calcio players
Parma Calcio 1913 players
A.C. Monza players
U.S. Alessandria Calcio 1912 players
U.S. Viterbese 1908 players
Serie A players
Serie B players